Tanya Mary Monro  FOSA FAIP GAICD (born 1973) is an Australian physicist known for her work in photonics. She has been Australia's Chief Defence Scientist since 8 March 2019. Prior to that she was the Deputy Vice Chancellor, Research and Innovation (DVCR&I) at the University of South Australia. She was awarded the ARC Georgina Sweet Australian Laureate Fellowship in 2013. She was the inaugural chair of photonics, the inaugural director of the ARC Centre of Excellence for Nanoscale Biophotonics and the inaugural director of the Institute for Photonics & Advanced Sensing (IPAS), and the inaugural director of the Centre of Expertise in Photonics (CoEP) within the School of Chemistry and Physics at the University of Adelaide (now known as the School of Physical Sciences). Monro has remained an adjunct professor of physics at the University of Adelaide following her departure from the institution.

External roles include membership of the Australian Prime Minister's Commonwealth Science Council, the Board of the CSIRO, the South Australian Economic Development Board in which she chairs the Arts subcommittee, and the Defence SA board.

Monro took up the role of Chief Defence Scientist in March 2019, the first woman in this position.

Education
Monro was awarded a Bachelor of Science degree with first class honours in 1995 followed by a PhD in 1998 from the University of Sydney for research on waveguides. Monro credits a teacher at Sydney Church of England Girls Grammar with inspiring her interest in physics.

Career and research
From 1998 to 2004, Monro was a Royal Society University Research Fellowship at the Optoelectronics Research Centre (ORC) at the University of Southampton. She joined the University of Adelaide in 2005 as inaugural chair of photonics and Director of the Centre of Expertise in Photonics (CoEP) within the School of Chemistry & Physics in partnership with DSTO and the SA State Government. Since that time and while at the University of Adelaide she has been: ARC Federation Fellow; Director of the Institute for Photonics & Advanced Sensing (IPAS) and the  Director of the ARC Centre of Excellence in Nanoscale Biophotonics at the University of Adelaide. From 2014 to 2019  she was the Deputy Vice Chancellor and Vice President, Research and Innovation at the University of South Australia.

Publications 
Monro has published a few book chapters, and 600 papers including refereed journal articles and conference papers. These have led to over 13000 citations in journals and refereed conference proceedings. Monro has also registered 18 patent families.

Honours and awards

2022 Appointed Companion of the Order of Australia in the 2022 Queen's Birthday Honours for "eminent service to scientific and technological development, to research and innovation, to tertiary education, particularly in the field of photonics, and to professional organisations".
2015 Fellow, Optical Society of America (FOSA)
2015 Beattie Steel Medal, Australian Optical Society
2013–18 ARC Georgina Sweet Laureate Fellowship
2012 Pawsey Medal 
2012 Fellow, Australian Academy of Science (FAA)
2011 Scopus Young Researcher of the Year, Physical Sciences, Australia
2011 Eureka Prize for Science Leadership, finalist
2011 Selected by the Australian Academy of Science to conduct a speaker series in the European region
2011 Australian of the Year, South Australia
2010 Telstra Business Woman of the Year, White Pages Community & Government Category (National & South Australian winner)
2010 Winner, Science category, South Australian of the Year Awards
2010 South Australian Scientist of the Year
2010 Finalist, Eureka Prize for Science Leadership
2009 Fellow, Academy of Technological Sciences & Engineering, ATSE (FTSE)
2009 Winner, Science Category, Emerging Leaders Award (by Weekend Australian Magazine)
2008–13 ARC Federation Fellowship  
2008 Prime minister's Malcolm McIntosh Prize for Physical Scientist of the Year
2007–08 Awarded the Women in Physics Lecture Tour (Australian Institute of Physics)
2007 Rising Star Award, South Australia's "Top 50" across all fields under 35
2006 Bright Spark Award (for Australia's Top 10 Scientific Minds under 45 – Cosmos Magazine)
2005 Inaugural chair of photonics
2000 Royal Society University Research Fellowship
1998 Eleanor Sophia Wood Travelling Fellowship
1998 The Bragg Gold Medal for Excellence in Physics for the best PhD thesis by a student from an Australian university

Professional associations
Fellow, Optical Society of America (FOSA)
Fellow, Australian Academy of Science (FAA)
Bragg Fellow, RI Aus (Royal Institution Australia)
Fellow, ATSE (FTSE)

Personal life
Monro was raised in the Sydney suburb of Bankstown. She is an alumna of the National Youth Science Forum, a selective youth camp at the Australian National University for potential leaders in science. She married David in 1995. They moved to England in 1998. They have three sons, the first born in 2003, followed by twin boys born in 2006. Monro is a science fiction fan, and played cello in the Burnside Symphony Orchestra in Adelaide.

References

1973 births
Living people
Australian people of Italian descent
Companions of the Order of Australia
Fellows of the Australian Academy of Science
Fellows of the Australian Academy of Technological Sciences and Engineering
Fellows of the Australian Institute of Physics
Australian physicists
Australian women scientists
Academic staff of the University of South Australia
Academic staff of the University of Adelaide
Chief Defence Scientists
People educated at Sydney Church of England Girls Grammar School
Australian women academics
Women in optics